George Norman (17 June 1927 – 13 October 2012) was a British modern pentathlete. He competed at the 1956 Summer Olympics.

References

1927 births
2012 deaths
British male modern pentathletes
Olympic modern pentathletes of Great Britain
Modern pentathletes at the 1956 Summer Olympics
Sportspeople from York